The Office of the United States Trade Representative (USTR) is an agency of the United States federal government responsible for developing and promoting American trade policy. Part of the Executive Office of the President, it is headed by the U.S. Trade Representative, a Cabinet-level position that serves as the U.S. President's primary advisor, negotiator, and spokesperson on trade matters. USTR has more than two hundred employees, with offices in Geneva, Switzerland, and Brussels, Belgium.

USTR was established as the Office of the Special Trade Representative (STR) by the Trade Expansion Act of 1962, leads trade negotiations at bilateral and multilateral levels, and coordinates trade policy with other government agencies through the Trade Policy Committee (TPC), Trade Policy Committee Review Group (TPCRG), and Trade Policy Staff Committee (TPSC). Its areas of expertise include foreign direct investment, commodity agreements, trade-related intellectual property protection, and trade disputes before the World Trade Organisation. Based in Washington, D.C., Katherine Tai is the current United States Trade Representative.

Organization

Leadership
The head of the office holds the title of United States Trade Representative (USTR), which is a Cabinet-level position, though not technically within the Cabinet, as is the case with office heads not of US departments but rather of offices contained within the Executive Office of the President. To fill the post, the president nominates someone for the position, and the appointment is then approved or rejected by a simple majority of the Senate. The United States trade representative and deputy United States trade representatives (DUSTR) carry the title of Ambassador.

In the Obama administration, Michael Froman served as the US trade representative from 2013 to 2017, with Michael Punke and Robert Holleyman serving as deputy US trade representatives. Ambassador Punke also concurrently served as the U.S. ambassador to the World Trade Organization (WTO). Robert Lighthizer served during the Trump Presidency. Katherine Tai, the current U.S. trade representative, was nominated by Joe Biden and confirmed by the Senate on March 17, 2021, by a vote of 98–0.

Office of WTO and Multilateral Affairs
The USTR participates in the World Trade Organization, which is currently in the Doha Development Round. This is partially managed by the USTR Office of WTO and Multilateral Affairs (WAMA). Relevant WTO agreements include the Agreement on Trade-Related Aspects of Intellectual Property Rights (TRIPS) and the Generalized System of Preferences.

History of the United States Trade Representative
Trade negotiations became more complicated in the twentieth century with the rise of multilateral organizations and technological advances allowing for more commerce. As a result, the organization of the U.S. government (with Congress in charge of regulating foreign commerce and the executive branch in charge of treaties) became less efficient and in 1962 Congress passed a bill calling for the president to appoint a Special Representative for Trade Negotiations who would make suggestions to the president on the matters of trade. In the 1970s, Congress expanded this position, making it more accountable to Congress (the position has been called "a creature of congress"), and made it cabinet-level. Finally, in 1980 the position was renamed the United States Trade Representative.

The Omnibus Trade and Competitiveness Act of 1988 elevated the position's role to "coordinate trade policy, serve as the President's principal trade advisor and trade 'spokesperson', and lead U.S. international trade negotiations". It also "required the USTR to report to both the President and Congress".

Issue areas
 Agriculture
 Economy and trade
 Enforcement
 Environment
 Government procurement
 Industry and manufacturing
 Intellectual property
 Labor
 Preference Programs
 Services and Investment
 Small Business
 Textiles and apparel
 Trade and development
 Trade organizations (The World Trade Organization (WTO), Asia-Pacific Economic Cooperation (APEC), Association of Southeast Asian Nations (ASEAN), and the Organization for Economic Co-operation and Development (OECD).

Reports

National Trade Estimate
The National Trade Estimate Report on Foreign Trade Barriers (National Trade Estimate or NTE) is an annual series prepared by the USTR, which reports significant foreign barriers to U.S. exports. Since 1986, the NTE has provided, where feasible, quantitative estimates of the impact of these foreign practices on the value of U.S. exports. Information is also included on actions taken to eliminate barriers. It is based on information provided by USTR, the U.S. departments of commerce and agriculture, and other agencies and sources.

The Special 301 Report

The Special 301 Report is prepared annually by the USTR under Section 182 as amended of the Trade Act of 1974. The act states that the USTR must on an annual basis, by April of each year:
identify those foreign countries that deny adequate and effective protection of intellectual property rights, or deny fair and equitable markets access to United States persons that rely upon intellectual property protection, and those foreign countries identified under" this "paragraph that are determined by the Trade Representative to be priority foreign countries". The Act defines "priority foreign countries" as "those foreign countries that have the most onerous or egregious acts, policies, or practices that deny adequate and effective intellectual property rights, or deny fair and equitable market access to United States persons that rely upon intellectual property protection, whose acts, policies, or practices described in" this "paragraph have the greatest adverse impact (actual or potential) on the relevant United States products, and that are not entering into good faith negotiations, or making significant progress in bilateral or multilateral negotiations to provide adequate and effective protection of intellectual property rights.
The Uruguay Round Agreement Act furthermore states that countries may be identified under Special 301 "taking into account the history of intellectual property laws and practices of the foreign country, including any previous identifications" and "the history of efforts of the United States, and the response of the foreign country, to achieve adequate and effective protection and enforcement of intellectual property rights". It also states that compliance with the Agreement on Trade-Related Aspects of Intellectual Property Rights does not include a country from being identified as denying "adequate and effective protection of intellectual property rights".

Notorious markets

In 2006, along with the International Intellectual Property Alliance, the USTR published a list of places where large-scale copyright infringement takes place in the Special 301 Report. Since 2010, the notorious markets report has been published as a separate report.

List of United States trade representatives

See also
 International Trade Administration
 United States International Trade Commission
 United States Commercial Service

References

External links
 USTR website
 Office of the United States Trade Representative in the Federal Register
 USTR Reports and Publications.
 Google Books

 
Foreign trade of the United States
Anti-dumping authorities
Trade Representative
Foreign relations agencies of the United States
Trade Representative
United States trade law
United States trade policy
+
United States diplomacy